The New Democratic Party fielded a full slate of 282 candidates in the 1984 Canadian federal election, and won thirty seats to retain their status as the third-largest party in the House of Commons of Canada.

Many of the party's candidates have individual biography pages on Wikipedia.  Information on others may be found here.

Quebec

Saint-Léonard—Anjou: Terrence Trudeau
Terrence Trudeau identified as a physician. He received 7,506 votes (12.67%), finishing third against Liberal Party candidate Alfonso Gagliano.

References